A rauk is a column-like landform in Sweden and Norway, often equivalent to a stack. Rauks often occur in groups called "raukfält" or "rauk fields". The limestone rauks of Gotland in the Baltic Sea are among the best known examples.

Sweden 
Rauks are common on the island of Gotland, Sweden and on the smaller islands belonging to Gotland County. Fårö island in Gotland, is particularly rich in rauks. While Fårö is on the northern end of Gotland Holmhällars raukfält at Vamlingbo in the southern end of Gotland is also rich in rauks. Rauks in Gotland often occur in groups or fields, so-called raukfält. Rauks can be found both near Gotland's many cliffs or far away from these.

Other localities with rauks include Byrum on northwestern Öland neighboring Blå Jungfrun island, Hovs Hallar and Kullaberg in northwestern Scania and Härnön in northern Sweden's High Coast. Rauks on Öland are made up of limestone. A few rauks are located in the Scandinavian Mountains in northern Sweden's Sarek and Padjelanta national parks.

Norway 

In Norway, there are rauks in Trollholmssund where, according to local lore, the rauks are petrified trolls. In Trollholmsund, rauks are made up of dolomite rock. Varanger Peninsula in northern Norway is rich in rauks and they also occur elsewhere along the Finnmark coastline.

In Norway the term rauk is also applied to isolated residual mountains in the flat strandflat landscape along the coast.

Geology 

Rauks are usually formed by wave erosion. On Öland and Gotland, rauks are chiefly formed along or near the escarpment known as the Baltic Klint. Gotland rauks consist of limestone representing reefs that existed in the Silurian period. As waves batter against limestone cliffs, pre-existing vertical fractures begin to erode and widen. Eventually this leads to the formation of caves that merge, and the remaining central rock has now become rauks.

The rauks of Gotland formed after the last ice age. It is unclear to which extent different rauks in Gotland started to form from a cliffed coast, a dissected coast or from glacial landforms. A comparison of photographs from 1900 and from 1966 has shown that some rauks had been destroyed during that period.

Carl Linnaeus, who visited Gotland in 1741, was the first scientist to describe rauks. He called them stenjättar (stone giants) while also noting the ruiniform shape of same rauks.

In Sarek National Park rauks originate as aeolian landforms, thus, contrary to other rauks, they are shaped more by wind than by water. These rauks are made of sandstone that belongs to the Sierggavággenappe of the Scandinavian Caledonides.

See also
 Byrums raukar
 Hoburgen

References

External links 
 

Geography of Gotland County
Geography of Norway
Öland
 
Coastal geography
Coasts of the Baltic Sea
Coastal and oceanic landforms
Oceanographical terminology